Hypsiscopus is a genus of snakes of the family Homalopsidae. The name comes from the Greek words Hypsi, meaning high or lofty, and scopus, meaning view, and refers to the location of the eyes, which are set high on the heads of these snakes.

Species
There are three recognized species:
 Hypsiscopus matannensis (Boulenger, 1897)
 Hypsiscopus plumbea (Boie, 1827)
 Hypsiscopus murphyi (Bernstein et al., 2022)

References

Snake genera
Colubrids
Snakes of Asia
Taxa named by Leopold Fitzinger